The Holbrook Superconductor Project is the world's first production superconducting transmission power cable.  The lines were commissioned in 2008. The suburban Long Island electrical substation is fed by a 600 meter long tunnel containing approximately 155,000 meters of high-temperature superconductor wire manufactured by American Superconductor, installed underground and chilled to superconducting temperature with liquid nitrogen.

Project
The project was funded by the United States Department of Energy, and operates as part of the Long Island Power Authority (LIPA) power grid. The project team comprised American Superconductor, Nexans, Air Liquide and LIPA. It broke ground on July 4, 2006, was first energized April 22, 2008, and was commissioned on June 25, 2008. Between commissioning and March 2009 refrigeration events impacted normal operation.

The superconductor is bismuth strontium calcium copper oxide (BSCCO) which superconducts at liquid nitrogen temperatures. Other parts of the system include a  liquid nitrogen storage tank, a Brayton cycle Helium refrigerator, and a number of cryostats which manage the transition between cryogenic and ambient temperatures. The system capacity is 574 MVA with an operating voltage of 138 kV at a maximum current of 2400 A.

References 

Superconductivity
Electric power transmission systems in the United States
Electric power distribution
Energy infrastructure on Long Island, New York